Robert Crone (4 January 1870 – 15 January 1943) was an Irish football player and coach. He was the younger brother of fellow player Billy Crone.

Career

Playing career
Crone, who played as a full back, played club football in both Ireland and England for Distillery, Glentoran, Middlesbrough, West Bromwich Albion, Burton Swifts, Notts County, Bedminster and Brentford.

Crone also earned four international caps for Ireland between 1889 and 1890.

Coaching career
After retiring as a player in 1901, Crone became a coach at Bristol City (1901–1903), Brentford (1902–1908, also serving briefly as caretaker manager in 1906), West Bromwich Albion (1908–1909) and Workington (1909–1910). He served as trainer at Southern League side Swansea Town between 1912 and 1914, working under former Brentford colleague Walter Whittaker.

References

External links
NIFG

1870 births
1943 deaths
Irish association footballers (before 1923)
Pre-1950 IFA international footballers
Lisburn Distillery F.C. players
Glentoran F.C. players
Middlesbrough F.C. players
West Bromwich Albion F.C. players
Burton Swifts F.C. players
Notts County F.C. players
Bristol City F.C. players
English Football League players
Association footballers from Belfast
Swansea City A.F.C. non-playing staff
West Bromwich Albion F.C. non-playing staff
Western Football League players
Bedminster F.C. players
Southern Football League players
Brentford F.C. managers
Brentford F.C. players
Southern Football League managers

Association football fullbacks
Irish association football managers